= Murder in North Dakota law =

Murder in North Dakota law constitutes the intentional killing, under circumstances defined by law, of people within or under the jurisdiction of the U.S. state of North Dakota.

The United States Centers for Disease Control and Prevention reported that in the year 2020, the state had a murder rate near somewhat below the median for the entire country.

== History ==
Prior to statehood, the legislature of the Dakota Territory, including what would become both North Dakota and South Dakota, adopted the territory's first Penal Code in 1863. In 1865, this was repealed and "replaced with the code then in use in New York state", under which murder "was not defined by degree and was in all cases to be punishable by death".

This was amended in 1883 to shift the determination of whether the capital punishment was to be imposed from the judge to the jury. The crime became divided between first degree murder, punishable by death by hanging or life imprisonment, and second degree murder, punishable by a sentence of 10 to 30 years. Only eight cases resulted in death sentences between 1883 and 1915, when capital punishment was abolished in the state, except where a prisoner murdered a prison guard. The latter provision was never actually used.

In the 1997 case of State v. Garcia, the state supreme court "upheld life without parole sentence for 16-year-old convicted of murder; the defense presented no mitigating evidence during its sentencing hearing".

== Penalties ==
As of 2024, murder is a class AA crime, carrying upto life without parole.
